The Best of Poison: 20 Years of Rock is a compilation album from the American rock band Poison, released to celebrate the band's 20 year anniversary. It has sold more than 1 million copies to date in the U.S as of September 2009. The album was released on April 3, 2006, on EMI

Release and promotion
The album features many songs from the band's 20-year career. Most notable is the song "Every Rose Has Its Thorn", which was the band's biggest hit, a power ballad. A rare cover of the KISS classic "Rock and Roll All Nite" appears, previously only available on the soundtrack to the movie "Less Than Zero". The compilation also includes a new single, the Grand Funk Railroad roadie classic "We're an American Band", which also features a music video.

The cover art is taken from the book Pornography: Opposing Viewpoints.

The album was produced by Don Was and marked Poison's return to the Billboard 200 top 20 charts for the first time since 1993. The compilation debuted at No. 17, quite an impressive showing for a hair metal band in 2006, and perhaps showing the beneficial effect of many Behind the Music-type shows on VH1, where Poison's hair metal antics were relived. The album also charted at No. 5 on the Top Rock Albums, No. 4 on the Top Catalog Albums and No. 10 on the Top Hard Rock Albums chart.

"The Best of Poison: 20 Years of Rock" was certified Gold in 2006 by the RIAA.

Track listing 
CD:

DVD
A special edition of The Best of Poison: 20 Years of Rock was released which included a bonus greatest hits DVD compilation. The DVD includes the new video "We're an American Band" plus some of the band's biggest hits.

 I Want Action
 Every Rose Has Its Thorn
 Your Mama Don't Dance
 Nothin' But a Good Time
 Something To Believe In
 Unskinny Bop
 Talk Dirty to Me - Live on MTV Unplugged
 We're an American Band

Personnel
 Bret Michaels - lead vocals; rhythm guitar, acoustic guitar (track 4,8,13,15), keyboards
 Bobby Dall - bass guitar, piano (track 13)
 Rikki Rockett - drums; percussion
 C.C. DeVille - lead guitar, keyboards (track 3,8,14)
 Richie Kotzen - lead guitar on track 15
 Evren Göknar - Mastering Engineer

Charts

Certifications

References 

2006 greatest hits albums
Albums produced by Don Was
2006 video albums
Music video compilation albums
Poison (American band) compilation albums
Poison (American band) video albums